Haliyhuman (also Romanized as Halīyhūman; also known as Halīmand and Halīyūmand) is a village in Garmab Rural District, Chahardangeh District, Sari County, Mazandaran Province, Iran. At the 2006 census, its population was 141, in 28 families.

References 

Populated places in Sari County